Yim Ho (Chinese:嚴浩) is a Hong Kong director most active in the 1980s, and a leader of the Hong Kong New Wave.

He began his career making television programs for RTHK, then became a film director in 1980.

One of his most critically acclaimed works was Homecoming (1984). This film was different from other films of that period in that it presents certain emotions and sympathies towards the relationship between Mainland China and Hong Kong (the Sino-British Joint Declaration was signed the same year Homecoming was released).

The film brings together two very well known actresses, Josephine Koo and Siqin Gaowa. Anita Mui's theme song with the same title as the film has also been a popular cantopop song.

Ho's son Linq Yim (Chinese:严艺之, otherwise known as 嚴羚) is an actor, musician, and director who acted in Ho's 2005 film A West Lake Moment, and  composed its original soundtrack.

Filmography
 The Extra (1978)
 The Happening (1980)
 Wedding Bells, Wedding Bells (1981)
 Homecoming (1984) - 10 Hong Kong Film Awards nominations
Hong Kong Film Awards winners: Best Film, Best Director, Best Screenplay, Best Actress, Best New Performer, Best Art Direction
Hong Kong Film Awards nominations: Best Cinematography, Best Film Editing, Best Original Film Song, Best Original Film Score
 Red Dust (1990) - 12 Taipei Golden Horse Film Festival and Awards nominations
Taipei Golden Horse Film Festival and Awards winners: Best Film, Best Director, Best Cinematography, Best Actress, Best Supporting Actress, Best Art Direction, Best Costume and Make-up, Best Original Score 
Taipei Golden Horse Film Festival and Awards nominations: Best Screenplay, Best Editing, Best Original Song, Best Sound Design 
Hong Kong Film Awards nominations: Best Film, Best Director, Best Screenplay, Best Supporting Actress, Best Cinematography, Best Film Editing, Best Original Film Score, Best Original Film Score
Singapore International Film Festival nominated: Best Asian Feature Film 
 King of Chess (1991)
Hong Kong Film Awards nomination: Best Actor 
 No Sun City  (1992)
 The Day the Sun Turned Cold (1994)
Tokyo International Film Festival winners: Best Film, Best Director 
Hong Kong Film Awards nominations: Best Film, Best Director 
Hong Kong Film Critics Society Awards winners: Film of Merit, Best Actress 
 The Sun Has Ears (1996)
Berlin International Film Festival winners: FIPRESCI Prize, Silver Bear for Best Director

Berlin International Film Festival nomination: Golden Bear 
Hundred Flowers Awards winners: Best Actress 
 Kitchen (1997)
Puchon International Fantastic Film Festival winner: Best of Puchon 
Berlin International Film Festival nomination: Golden Bear
Chicago International Film Festival nomination: Gold Hugo 
Hong Kong Film Awards nominations: Best Original Song, Best Supporting Actor 
 Pavilion of Women (2001)
 A West Lake Moment (2005)
Taipei Golden Horse Film Festival and Awards nominations: Best Screenplay, Best Actor 
 Floating City (2012)

Awards and nominations
Hong Kong Film Awards
1985 Best Director award for Homecoming
1991 Best Director nomination for Red Dust
1991 Best Screenplay nomination for Red Dust
1996 Best Director nomination for The Day the Sun Turned Cold

Taipei Golden Horse Film Festival and Awards
1990 Best Director award for Red Dust
1990 Best Film award for Red Dust
2004 Best Screenplay nomination for A  Lake Moment

Berlin International Film Festival
1996 Silver Bear award for The Sun Has Ears
1996 FIPRESCI prize for The Sun Has Ears
1996 Golden Bear nomination for The Sun Has Ears
1997 Golden Bear nomination for Kitchen

Tokyo International Film Festival
1994 Best Film award for The Day the Sun Turned Cold
1994 Best Director award for The Day the Sun Turned Cold

Puchon International Fantastic Film Festival
1997 Best of Puchon for Kitchen

Chicago International Film Festival
1997 Gold Hugo nomination for Kitchen

References

External links
 
 HK cinemagic entry

Hong Kong film directors
1952 births
Living people
Silver Bear for Best Director recipients
Alumni of the London Film School